Grand Sport may refer to:
 Grand Sport Records, a Norwegian record label
 Grand Sport Group, a sports equipment company based in Thailand
 Grand Sport, models of Chevrolet Corvette
 A 1963 model of Chevrolet Corvette (C2)
 A 1996 model of Chevrolet Corvette (C4)
 A 2010 model of Chevrolet Corvette (C6)
 A 2017 model of Chevrolet Corvette (C7)
 Grand Sport, a model of Bugatti Veyron

See also 
 Buick Gran Sport, a car